John Moylan (born 11 January 1953) is  a former Australian rules footballer who played with North Melbourne and Footscray in the Victorian Football League (VFL).

Notes

External links 		
		
		
		
		
		
		
Living people		
1953 births		
		
Australian rules footballers from Victoria (Australia)		
North Melbourne Football Club players		
Western Bulldogs players
University Blues Football Club players